Congratulations is the second studio album by American rock band MGMT. It was initially made available for free streaming through the band's website on March 20, 2010, prior to its official release on April 13 through Columbia Records. The album marks a departure from the synth-pop style that brought MGMT acclaim on their debut, Oracular Spectacular, released three years prior, and features a more psychedelic, progressive and guitar-driven sound.

Most of the songs were written by the band in early 2009. They eventually headed to a Malibu studio to work on Congratulations, along with former Spacemen 3 member Peter Kember, known professionally as Sonic Boom. Vocal contributions from Royal Trux singer Jennifer Herrema were also recorded for the album. Andrew VanWyngarden has stated that the album is influenced by the band's massive rise in popularity since Oracular Spectaculars release. "It's us trying to deal with all the craziness that's been going on since our last album took off. Sometimes it just doesn't feel natural".

Congratulations debuted at number two on the US Billboard 200 with 66,000 copies sold in its first week, marking the best sales week for the band. , it had sold 219,000 copies in the United States. The album debuted at number four on the UK Albums Chart, selling 17,000 copies in its first week.

Background
Speaking to Spin magazine on January 12, 2010, VanWyngarden declared that the album was finished, saying, "It's mixed and mastered, and now we're just working on presenting it to the world". On January 18, MGMT stated that they would prefer not to release any singles from the album.

In an interview with NME, Goldwasser explained, "We'd rather people hear the whole album as an album and see what tracks jump out rather than the ones that get played on the radio – if anything gets played on the radio!" He also said, "There definitely isn't a 'Time to Pretend' or a 'Kids' on the album. We've been talking about ways to make sure people hear the album as an album in order and not just figure out what are the best three tracks, download those and not listen to the rest of it".

Singles
Despite the band's pledge to not release singles, the album's lead single, "Flash Delirium", was made available as a free download on their website on March 9, 2010, before being generally released on March 23.

"Siberian Breaks", the second single, was released on April 17. "It's Working" was released on June 26 as the third single. The album's title track was also released as the fourth and final single from the album on November 26.

Artwork
The cover art was done by Anthony Ausgang, known for his kitschy lowbrow art style. The artwork depicts a hedgehog-like animal on a surfboard, surfing on a wave that is anthropomorphized as a cat about to swallow the creature. Commenting on the composition of the artwork, Ausgang stated that he tried to "use bright colors and get across ideas that are slightly dark."

Release
Following an online leak, the band offered the album for free streaming on their official website on March 20, 2010, and stated that they "wanted to offer it as a free download but that didn't make sense to anyone but [them]".

Prior to its general release, a countdown appeared on the band's website on February 5, 2010, alongside a webcam image of a beach. The clock would eventually count down to 12:00 AM (EST) on April 13, when the album was officially released by Columbia Records.

The bonus track "Inbetween the Liners" consists of an instrumental outtake of a song called "Forest Elf" from the Congratulations sessions, with producer Peter Kember reading the album's liner notes out loud while the track plays backwards.

"Forest Elf" was eventually released on the live album 11•11•11, 12 years after the release of Congratulations.

Critical reception

Congratulations received generally positive reviews from music critics. The album holds a score of 72 out of 100 on the review aggregator website Metacritic based on 39 reviews, indicating "generally favorable reviews". Chicago Tribune critic Greg Kot called it an "impressive step up" from MGMT's debut Oracular Spectacular and wrote that the album sacrifices accessibility in favor of embracing "the duo's interests in waving the Barrett-era freak flag". Gregory Heaney of AllMusic felt that Congratulations "matches, if not triumphs over, their earlier work", concluding that while the band's "more dynamic approach to songwriting" results in a lack of obvious single choices, it nonetheless makes for "an all around better album." Celina Murphy of Hot Press felt that MGMT "have achieved what they set out to do and you have to admire them for risking their successful hides for a walk on the psychedelic side." Spins Charles Aaron wrote that "despite being haunted by the group’s flip from rock-star charade to reality, Congratulations still brims with mischievous energy. And for a series of druggy Dada setpieces, it feels uncommonly, emotionally honest." In Mojo, writer Shelby Powell noted the group's homage to British rock musicians Dan Treacy of Television Personalities and Brian Eno, complete with faux accents in MGMT's delivery on a few songs; Eno, who is the subject of one of the songs, described the work as "very flattering", and added: "I appreciate the way they managed to make the song both fond and tongue in cheek at the same time".

In a mixed assessment, Rolling Stones Will Hermes adjudged Congratulations to be "a hazy, hit-and-miss album that will likely alienate some fans of the debut, but one that also testifies to MGMT's restlessness as songwriters and human beings." The Guardian critic Dave Simpson felt that much of Congratulations "isn't bad, just baffling", but that its eclectic nature "has produced a sonic adventure, with lovely moments", singling out the title track as proof that MGMT "haven't entirely forgotten how to write a killer tune." Scott Plagenhoef of Pitchfork deemed Congratulations "audacious, ambitious, and a little fried", writing that several songs contain "a surplus of ideas when a few good ones would have done... the less cluttered and more focused their tracks are, the better they turn out." Robert Christgau, in MSN Music, panned the album as "airy prog-psych self-indulgence" that elaborates on the less memorable portions of Oracular Spectacular, and that "even as self-indulgent elaborations go, the follow-up's a doozy."

Track listing

Personnel
Credits adapted from the liner notes of Congratulations.

MGMT
 Andrew VanWyngarden – vocals, guitars, percussion ; drums ; bass ; synths ; Casio guitar ; piano ; fake flute ; harmonica ; electric sitar 
 Ben Goldwasser – synths, samples ; organ ; piano ; Omnichord ; numerology ; additional vocals ; percussion

Additional musicians
 James Richardson – guitars ; synths ; Casio guitar ; synth drums ; glockenspiel ; saxophone ; panpipes ; additional vocals ; percussion
 Matt Asti – guitars ; bass ; piano ; additional vocals ; field recordings and treatments, percussion
 Will Berman – drums ; guitars ; bass ; additional vocals, additional synths, percussion
 Sonic Boom – master of ceremonies ; modular synth ; harmonica and percussion treatments ; effects ; Gakken SX-150 
 Britta Phillips – additional vocals 
 Jennifer Herrema – additional vocals 
 Gillian Rivers – strings 
 Dave Kadden – Oboe, sundries

Technical
 MGMT – production
 Sonic Boom – production
 Billy Bennett – engineering
 Matt Boynton – additional engineering
 Dave Fridmann – additional engineering, mixing
 Daniel Johnson – engineering assistance
 Greg Calbi – mastering

Artwork
 Josh Cheuse – art direction, design, photography
 Anthony Ausgang – cover painting
 A, B & C – collage

Charts

Weekly charts

Year-end charts

Certifications

Notes

References

External links
 Congratulations album blog

2010 albums
Columbia Records albums
MGMT albums